Brazil is the largest country in both South America and Latin America. Brazil's economy is the world's ninth-largest by nominal GDP and seventh-largest by GDP (PPP) . A member of the BRICS group, Brazil until 2010 had one of the world's fastest growing major economies, with its economic reforms giving the country new international recognition and influence. Brazil's national development bank plays an important role for the country's economic growth. Brazil is a founding member of the United Nations, the G20, BRICS, Unasul, Mercosul, Organization of American States, Organization of Ibero-American States, CPLP, and the Latin Union. Brazil is a regional power in Latin America and a middle power in international affairs, with some analysts identifying it as an emerging global power. One of the world's major breadbaskets, Brazil has been the largest producer of coffee for the last 150 years.

For further information on the types of business entities in this country and their abbreviations, see "Business entities in Brazil".

Largest firms 

This list shows firms in the Fortune Global 500, which ranks firms by total revenues reported before March 31, 2017. Only the top five firms (if available) are included as a sample.

Notable firms 
This list includes notable companies with primary headquarters located in the country. The industry and sector follow the Industry Classification Benchmark taxonomy. Organizations which have ceased operations are included and noted as defunct.

References 

 
Brazil